Medal for Bravery (Gold) (Chinese: 金英勇勳章, MBG) is the first Medal for Bravery rank of the Hong Kong honours system.  It is awarded for acts of gallantry of the greatest possible heroism or of the most conspicuous courage in circumstances of extreme danger.  It was created in 1997 to replace the British honours system after the transfer of sovereignty to People's Republic of China and the establishment of Hong Kong Special Administrative Region (HKSAR).

List of recipients

1998 
 Mr. LEE Ying-kwong, MBG (posthumous)
 Mr. Thomas Frederick Crosier LARMOUR, MBG (posthumous)

1999 
 Mr. KWOK Kam-ming, MBG 
 Mr. TAM Chung-keung, Joemy, MBG

2000 
 Mr. LEUNG Kam-kwong, Donald, MBG (posthumous) 
 Mr. LOO Chun-ho, MBG (posthumous) 
 Mr. LAI Yiu-chung, MBG (posthumous)

2001 
 Mr. CHIU Shun-on, MBG (posthumous)

2002 
 Mr. Zafar Iqbal KHAN, MBG (posthumous)

2003 
 Dr. TSE Yuen-man, MBG (posthumous)

2004 
 Mr. CHEUNG Chun-wai, MBG (posthumous)

2005 
 Mr. WONG Sai-kit, MBG

2006 
 Mr. CHU Chun-kwok, MBG 
 Mr. SIN Ka-keung, Wilson, MBG 
 Mr. TSANG Kwok-hang, MBG (posthumous)

2007 
 Mr. WONG Ka-hei, MBG (posthumous) 
 Mr. CHIN Kwok-ming, MBG

2008 
 Mr. CHAN Siu-lung, MBG (posthumous) 
 Mr. SIU Wing-fong, MBG (posthumous)

2010 
 Mr. WONG Fuk-wing, MBG (posthumous)
 Mr. YEUNG Chun-kit, MBG (posthumous)

2011 
 Mr. LEUNG Kam-wing, Ken, MBG (posthumous)
 Mr. FU Cheuk-yan, MBG (posthumous)
 Mr. TSE Ting-chunn, Masa, MBG (posthumous)

2015 
 Mr. LEUNG Kwok-kei, MBG (posthumous)

2016 
 Mr. CHEUNG Thomas Y. F., MBG (posthumous) 
 Mr. HUI Chi-kit, Samuel, MBG (posthumous)

2017 
 Mr. YAU Siu-ming, MBG (posthumous)

2020 

 Ms. NG Wing-man, Iris, MBG (posthumous)
 Mr. WONG Cheuk-bond, MBG (posthumous)
 Mr. CHENG Chak-yin, MBG
 Mr. LAI Chi-hang, Ben, MBG (posthumous)

2021 

 Ms. LAM Yuen-yee, MBG (posthumous)

References 

Lists of Hong Kong people
Civil awards and decorations of Hong Kong
Awards established in 1997